Hippuriphila is a genus of flea beetles in the family Chrysomelidae. There are 3 described species from the Nearctic and Palaearctic.

Species
 Hippuriphila canadensis Brown, 1942
 Hippuriphila equiseti Beller & Hatch, 1932
 Hippuriphila modeeri (Linnaeus, 1760) (= mancula)

References

Alticini
Chrysomelidae genera